Shubarteniz is a salt lake in Ulytau District, Karaganda Region, Kazakhstan.

In 1728, one of the battles of the Kazakh–Dzungar Wars took place near the lake and ended with the victory of the Kazakh Army.

Geography
Shubarteniz is a salt lake lying at the northern end of the Turan Lowland. The lake is shallow. The road between Koskol and Karsakpay skirts the northern end of the lake.

There are three main rivers flowing into the lake, the Baikonyr into the southeastern shore, the Zhymyky from the northeast, and the Kalmakkyrgan from the south. The Zhyngyldyozek flows out of the lake from the western shore. Shubarteniz is fed mainly by snow.
When the lake is full it has regular-shaped shores and there are a few small islands. During the summer Shubarteniz dries up turning into a sor, where the salt precipitates in numerous spots of the exposed bottom of the lake. The salt of Shubarteniz is of high quality.

Flora
There is little vegetation in the area of Shubarteniz, except for scattered spots of saltwort growth near the lakeshore.

See also
Kazakh semi-desert
List of lakes of Kazakhstan

References

External links

Method for preparing a salt and enriching ingredient composition
Гордость земли Костанайской
Место поклонения - Казахстанская правда

Lakes of Kazakhstan
Karaganda Region
Shalkarteniz basin